Triceratopsini is a tribe of herbivorous chasmosaurine dinosaurs that lived between the late Campanian to the late Maastrichtian stages of the Cretaceous period, between 74.73 and 66 million years ago. Fossils of these animals have been found in western North America, in particular West Canada, Western and Midwestern United States, which was once part of the ancient continent of Laramidia. The tribe was named by Nicholas R. Longrich in 2011 for the description of Titanoceratops, which he defined as "all species closer to Triceratops horridus than to Anchiceratops ornatus or Arrhinoceratops brachyops". Triceratopsins were the largest of the chasmosaurines; suggesting that gigantism had evolved in the Ceratopsidae once. In addition there is an evolutionary trend in the solidification of the frills, the most extreme being in Triceratops.

Systematics
The tribe was named by Nicholas R. Longrich in 2011 for the description of Titanoceratops, which he defined as "all species closer to Triceratops horridus than to Anchiceratops ornatus or Arrhinoceratops brachyops". Fossils of these animals have been found in western North America, in particular West Canada, Western and Midwestern United States, which was once part of the ancient continent of Laramidia.

The number of species and genera in recent years has been controversial, as some genera such as Torosaurus, Tatankaceratops, and Nedoceratops are wrapped up in debate as to whether they are ontogenetic (growth) stages of Triceratops, specimens or species of Triceratops, or unique genera based on morphometrics. In addition there is a genus, Agathaumas, which is considered to be a nomen dubium as it is based on ambiguous fragmentary fossils.

Phylogeny
For his phylogenetic analysis of Titanoceratops, Longrich (2011) only recognized three genera, with Eotriceratops, Ojoceratops, and Nedoceratops resolved as junior synonyms of Triceratops, as well as recognizing Torosaurus utahensis as a species of Triceratops:

In 2015 authors Caleb Brown & Donald Henderson conducted a phylogenetic analysis in the description of Regaliceratops and found Eotriceratops, Ojoceratops, and Nedoceratops to be valid genera. There is a polytomy between Regaliceratops, Eotriceratops, Ojoceratops, and a Titanoceratops–Triceratops clade as shown below:

Below is the result of a phylogenetic analysis by Jordan Mallon et al. (2016) from their description of Spiclypeus shipporum. Eotriceratops was removed from the Chasmosaurinae entirely because it was found that it decreases resolution in their analysis because of the authors' new interpretation of epiparietal configurations. Regaliceratops was not resolved as a member of the Triceratopsini.

See also

 Timeline of ceratopsian research

References

Ceratopsids
Chasmosaurines

es:Chasmosaurinae